Kim Kiri (sometimes romanized as Kim Kilee or Kim Giri) is a South Korean comedian best known from his appearances on the comedy sketch show Gag Concert aired by KBS2.

Filmography

Television show

Drama

Voice artist

Gag Concert Segments
Reali-T (2011)
Discoveries of Life (2011-2013)
Uncomfortable Truth (2011-2013)
Superstar KBS
Bongsunga School
모던보이
EBS Drama
노력의 결정체
We Are One (2012)
팀을 위한 길
Differently (2013)
The Boy Band (JeonGukGu) (2012-2013)
The Three Friends (2013-2014)
The King of Ratings (2013)
A Fairy Tales for Adult (2014)
Strongest Mentality (2014)
힙합의신/God of Hip Hop(2014)
 Stubborn (2015) 
 Yes or No (2015)
 Reaction Baseball League (2015)

Discography

Kaddu daniel

Awards and nominations

References

South Korean comedians
1985 births
Living people
Cube Entertainment artists
South Korean Protestants
Gim clan of Gyeongju
Gag Concert
People from South Chungcheong Province